Sense is the fifth album by In the Nursery, released in 1991 through Third Mind Records.

Track listing

Personnel 
In the Nursery
Klive Humberstone – instruments
Nigel Humberstone – instruments
Q. – percussion
Dolores Marguerite C – narration
Production and additional personnel
Steve Harris – production
In the Nursery – production

References

External links 
 

1991 albums
In the Nursery albums
Third Mind Records albums